Boucé may refer to the following places in France:

 Boucé, Allier, a commune in the department of Allier
 Boucé, Orne, a commune in the department of Orne